Elite Entertainment was an American home media distribution company, founded by Vincent Bancalari and Don May, Jr. in 1993. The company specialized in LaserDisc and later, DVD releases of horror, science fiction, and cult films, many of which were public domain titles. Their first release was George A. Romero's Night of the Living Dead (1968), which they distributed on LaserDisc in 1994.

History
Elite Entertainment formed between Vincent Bancalari and Don May, Jr. in April 1993. Both were working in the video distribution industry, and in conversation lamented the poor transfer of a recent home video release of Night of the Living Dead (1968). In January 1994, they managed to secure a distribution rights deal with the filmmakers, and subsequently crafted a series of special features for the release, including audio commentaries recorded in the ensuing months. Elite Entertainment released Night of the Living Dead on LaserDisc in November 1994 in a 2-disc set.

The company continued to release a series of cult horror films on LaserDisc throughout the 1990s, including The Evil Dead, Evil Dead 2, A Nightmare on Elm Street, A Nightmare on Elm Street 2: Freddy's Revenge, God Told Me To, Invaders from Mars, Maniac, and I Spit on Your Grave, among others. Several unrealized releases included Eaten Alive (originally due for a September 1998 LaserDisc release), as well as a LaserDisc double feature of The Boogeyman and The Devonsville Terror, originally due for a December 1998 release; the latter two films were subsequently released as a double-feature DVD by Anchor Bay Entertainment.

In the late-1990s, the company transitioned to releasing titles on DVD, including re-releases of several titles they previously released on LaserDisc, including I Spit on Your Grave in 2002. In 2000, the company released The House on Sorority Row for the first time on DVD. By 2000, the company had a total of 15 DVD releases in their catalogue, approximately one-third of which were public domain titles.

Select releases

References

Sources

Home video companies of the United States
Film distributors of the United States
Mass media companies established in 1993
1993 establishments in New Jersey
Companies based in Morris County, New Jersey
Rockaway, New Jersey